is a Japanese martial arts film made by Toei Company in 1975 and directed by Kazuhiko Yamaguchi. It is the second installment of a trilogy of films based on the manga Karate Baka Ichidai (literal title: "A Karate-Crazy Life") by Ikki Kajiwara, Jiro Tsunoda and Jōya Kagemaru.

Sonny Chiba reprises his role from Champion of Death as Masutatsu Oyama, the historical founder of Kyokushin karate in Japan (Oyama makes a cameo appearance in the film as well). Chiba had studied martial arts under the real-life Oyama for several years. True to the film's title, at one point in the course of the narrative he battles a "bear", actually a human actor in a bear costume.

Plot

Cast
Sonny Chiba as Mas Oyama
Eiji Gô	
Yutaka Nakajima

References

External links
Japanese Movie Database
 
 

1975 films
1975 action films
1975 martial arts films
Japanese action films
Films directed by Kazuhiko Yamaguchi
Karate films
1970s Japanese-language films
Toei Company films
Films scored by Shunsuke Kikuchi
1970s Japanese films